Ambar Datta (born 6 March 1938) was an Indian cricketer. He was a right-handed batsman and a right-arm off-break bowler who played for Bengal. He was born in Calcutta.

Datta made a single first-class appearance for the team, during the 1962-63 season, against Orissa. In the only innings in which he batted, he scored an unbeaten half-century, along with batting partner Prakash Pottar.

Datta bowled four overs during the match, conceding 31 runs.

External links
Ambar Dutta at Cricket Archive 

1938 births
Living people
Indian cricketers
Bengal cricketers